Nicholas John Henry Duigan (born 1 May 1970) is an Australian politician. He has been the Liberal member for Windermere in the Tasmanian Legislative Council since May 2021.

Duigan hosted the fishing television program Hook, Line and Sinker for over twenty years.

References

1970 births
Living people
Members of the Tasmanian Legislative Council
Liberal Party of Australia members of the Parliament of Tasmania
21st-century Australian politicians